ARDL may stand for:
American Roller Derby League, banked track roller derby league
Auckland Roller Derby League, flat track roller derby league in New Zealand